, whose real name is , is a former Japanese idol, singer and actress of the 1980s, who is currently a businesswoman.

She started in 1984, forming the group Asō Mamiko & Captain (or Aso Mamiko & Captain), with the duo of dancers and singers Captain. After their separation in 1987, she continued her solo career as Mamiko Asō, releasing two singles in Japan, and a few plays in drama and film. In the 1990s, she released three singles in Italy, including Drive me crazy to Love in 1995, which peaked #21 in the local charts. In 1998, she created a company name, TAJIMA, she directs and produces its own among other Italian wine. Now using the artist Mamiko name, she released a new single in 2000, Walking in the Sunshine, and then, Your Lies that she released in 2004, and a book on Italy in 2006, Torino. She then resumed her real name, Miwa Tajima, and entered politics, cash stand for elections in Japan in July 2010.

Discography

Singles

 
 *"Sasayaki wa Destiny" and, "Dakara Nakanaide Otoko" did not originally appear on the Japanese Oricon charts in Japan, but were released as singles only in Japan in 1987.

References

Aso Mamiko on Discogs 

1964 births
Living people
Musicians from Fukuoka Prefecture
Japanese actresses